"Body Shots", is a song of the American pop singer Kaci Battaglia. It is the second single from her second studio album Bring It On (2010).

Background
The lyrics for "Body Shots" were penned by Battaglia based on a conversation she had with some of her girlfriends right before her 21st birthday. She co-wrote all of the songs on the album. "I had been talking to some of my friends about what we were going to do when I turned 21," Battaglia explains, "and they were pushing for me to try a body shot. Later that day, when we were in the studio, I decided to see if I could capture what that experience might be like in a song. It was really fun to write and it already goes down a storm when I perform it live!" "Body Shots" was written by her and long-time collaborators Michael Grant, Arianna Wilson, and Jarreau and Trevor Pitts.

Release
The song was released through digital music retailers on July 13, 2010, and its EP of remixes was released on August 10, 2010. The song has been a success in the United States clubs, reaching number one at the Billboard Hot Dance Club Play chart.

Music video
The video premiered at Battaglia's official YouTube page on August 22, 2010. It features her and some girls dancing in the studio and also a guest appearance by Ludacris.

Background
About the video, Battaglia says, "Ludacris and I had an incredible time shooting the clip with European director, Stephanie Pistel – working in studios in both New York City and Miami. We took a very symbolic approach to the video and hope that we came up with something classy, fresh and fun."

Track listing
Digital single
"Body Shots" (Main Version) - 4:03

Remixes 
"Body Shots" (Mig & Rizzo Radio Edit) - 3:19
"Body Shots" (Wawa Radio Edit) - 3:05
"Body Shots" (Dave Audé Radio Edit) - 4:02
"Body Shots" (Ray Roc & Gabe Ramos Club Mix) - 6:15
"Body Shots" (Wawa Extended Mix) - 5:20
"Body Shots" (Dave Audé Club Mix) - 7:24
"Body Shots" (Mig & Rizzo Club Mix) - 5:47

Release history

Charts

See also
List of number-one dance singles of 2010 (U.S.)

References

2010 singles
2010 songs
Curb Records singles